Brian Joseph Kelly (28 July 1917 – 13 May 1985) was an Australian rules footballer who played with South Melbourne in the Victorian Football League (VFL).

Kelly, who played at South Melbourne during the Second World War, made his league debut in 1939. He appeared in all of South Melbourne's 18 games in 1941, one of only two players from the club to do so. As a back pocket, Kelly participated in the famous 1945 'Bloodbath' Grand Final.

In 1946, Kelly coached New Town to the TANFL Grand Final, where they lost to Sandy Bay. The following season, he was chosen to coach the South against North in an intrastate match.

References

1917 births
Sydney Swans players
Glenorchy Football Club coaches
Australian rules footballers from Melbourne
1985 deaths
People from Elsternwick, Victoria